The Great Atlantic and Pacific Tea Company Warehouse, also known as the A&P Warehouse and The Keystone Warehouse Company, is a historic warehouse building located in Buffalo, Erie County, New York. It was built in 1917, is an eight-story reinforced concrete industrial building encompassing 250,000 square feet of warehouse space.  It has a one-story wing built of concrete block walls and steel framing.  The building was occupied by The Great Atlantic & Pacific Tea Company until 1975.

The building is currently undergoing conversion and rehabilitation into loft residential units. It was listed on the National Register of Historic Places in 2016.

References

Gallery 

The Great Atlantic & Pacific Tea Company
Industrial buildings and structures on the National Register of Historic Places in New York (state)
Industrial buildings completed in 1917
Buildings and structures in Buffalo, New York
National Register of Historic Places in Buffalo, New York
Warehouses on the National Register of Historic Places